An amalaka, is a segmented or notched stone disk, usually with ridges on the rim, that sits on the top of a Hindu temple's shikhara or main tower.  According to one interpretation, the amalaka represents a lotus, and thus the symbolic seat for the deity below.  Another interpretation is that it symbolizes the sun, and is thus the gateway to the heavenly world.

The name and, according to some sources the shape, of the amalaka comes from the fruit of Phyllanthus emblica (or Mirobalanus embilica), the Indian gooseberry, or myrobolan fig tree.  This is called āmalaki in Sanskrit, and the fruit has a slightly segmented shape, though this is much less marked than in the architectural shape.

The amalaka itself is crowned with a kalasam or finial, from which a temple banner is often hung.

History

The shape first appears (or survives) as an element in the capitals of columns around the time of Ashoka in the 3rd century BCE, recurring in some capitals of the 1st century CE.  In some of these, as at the Great Chaitya at the Karla Caves, and the verandahs to Caves 3, 10 and 17 at the Pandavleni Caves, the amalaka is "boxed" with a rectangular framework cage.

The oldest representation of an Amalaka as the base for the kalasha is seen in a door jamb at the Dahshavatara temple at Deogarh, dated to about 500 AD.  Amalakas appear to have been common at the top of shikhara by the Gupta period, though no originals remain in place.  They were to remain standard in most of India, in the Nagara and Kalinga architecture styles of the west and east respectively, but not in the Dravidian architecture of South India.  Some early temples in the Deccan, such as the 7th-century Lakshamana temple in brick at Sirpur, have amalakas at the corners of some level of the shikhara (but not, as it survives, at the top in the usual way).

Symbolism
Like other parts of Hindu temple architecture, there is a large body of symbolic and mystical interpretation around the amalaka.  It is seen as a ring gripping and embracing a notional pillar that rises from the main cult image of the deity below it in the sanctum, and reaches up to heaven through the top of the temple.

Notes

References
Harle, J.C., The Art and Architecture of the Indian Subcontinent, 2nd edn. 1994, Yale University Press Pelican History of Art, 
Kramrisch, Stella, The Hindu Temple, Volume 2, 1996 (originally 1946), 9788120802223, google books

External links

 Khajuraho Architecture

Hindu temple architecture
Architectural elements
Monuments and memorials in India
Hindi words and phrases